Bhima Mandavi (died April 9, 2019) was a Bharatiya Janata Party politician and member of the Chhattisgarh Legislative Assembly from Dantewada assembly constituency.

He was assassinated by naxalites belonging to the Communist Party of India (Maoist) in Nakulnar village of Dantewada district in the state of Chhattisgarh.

References

External links
Bhima Mandavi election affidavit

Bharatiya Janata Party politicians from Chhattisgarh
2019 deaths
Assassinated Indian politicians
Chhattisgarh MLAs 2018–2023
People from Dantewada
Year of birth missing